King Khaled Military City Airport is an airport in King Khalid Military City, Eastern Province, Saudi Arabia. There are a limited number of civilian flights from the airport.

Facilities

See also

 List of things named after Saudi Kings
 Armed Forces of Saudi Arabia
 Saudi Arabian National Guard

References

General Authority of Civil Aviation

External links
 
 
 

1991 establishments in Saudi Arabia
Airports established in 1991
Airports in Saudi Arabia
Eastern Province, Saudi Arabia